Corby Kummer is executive director of Food & Society at the Aspen Institute, a senior lecturer at the Tufts Friedman School of Nutrition Science, and a senior editor of The Atlantic. 

Kummer is the author of The Joy of Coffee and The Pleasures of Slow Food, the first book in English on the Slow Food movement, He has been called "a dean among food writers in America" by The San Francisco Examiner. Julia Child once said of him, "I think he's a very good food writer. He really does his homework. As a reporter and a writer he takes his work very seriously." He has received six James Beard Journalism Awards.

Early life 
Corby Kummer is a son of Dr. Seymour I. Kummer of Ellington, Connecticut, and F. Ruth Kummer, and is a stepson of Joan Kummer.

He attended high school at Loomis Chaffee, and Yale University. 

He lives in Boston, Massachusetts.

Career 
In 1981, he joined The Atlantic magazine, where he wrote a longstanding and influential column on food, cooking, with a special focus on Italy and sustainable farming and food-making processes.  

In 1995 and 1996, he was a restaurant critic for New York magazine, leaving in 1997 to write restaurant reviews for Boston Magazine. 

From 2013-2016, he was the editor-in-chief and publisher of IDEAS: The Magazine of the Aspen Institute. From 2013-2016 Kummer served on the nominating committee of the Tony Awards. From 2013-2016 Kummer served on the nominating committee of the Tony Awards 

In 2014, he became executive director of Food & Society at the Aspen Institute. From 2014 through 2016 he was also restaurant critic for Atlanta Magazine. 

Kummer appears frequently on television and radio programs, including as a judge on The Food Network's Beat Bobby Flay and a weekly appearance on WGBH's Boston Public Radio.

He is a senior lecturer at Tufts University Friedman School.

Every week he is a featured commentator on food and food policy on WGBH's Boston Public Radio. 

He has been restaurant critic of New York, Boston, and Atlanta Magazines and food and food policy columnist for The New Republic. 

In May 2021, Kummer with Andrés, Rick Bayless, and Russell Jackson published, "Indoor dining must return. Just not the way we knew it," an opinion-editorial in the Washington Post. Together with Share Our Strength/No Kid Hungry, Kummer co-hosts the live web series, Conversations on Food Justice. 

He is executive director of Food and Society at the Aspen Institute.

Awards
Kummer is the winner of five James Beard Journalism Awards, presented by the James Beard Foundation for food writing. His most recent was in 2008. He has been a finalist for the National Magazine Awards.

Books
 The Joy of Coffee: The Essential Guide to Buying, Brewing, and Enjoying (2003)
 The Pleasures of Slow Food: Celebrating Authentic Traditions, Flavors, and Recipes (2008)

References

External links
 Official biography and articles at The Atlantic
 Official Twitter feed

1950s births
Living people
American food writers
American male non-fiction writers
American restaurant critics
The Atlantic (magazine) people
James Beard Foundation Award winners
Loomis Chaffee School alumni
Yale University alumni